Miss Supranational 2016 was the eighth Miss Supranational pageant. It was held on December 2, 2016, at MOSIR Arena in Krynica-Zdrój, Poland. Stephanía Vasquez Stegman of Paraguay crowned Srinidhi Shetty of India at the end of the event.

Contestants from 71 countries and territories competed in this year's Miss Supranational pageant, The pageant was hosted by Davina Reeves and Iwan Podriez.

Background

On June 1, 2016, The organization of World Beauty Association at Panama City, Panama, has announced that the pageant 8th edition of Miss Supranational will be take place in MOSIR Arena, the Spa Resort of Krynica-Zdrój, Poland again on Friday 2 December.

On October 5, 2016, Gerhard Parzutka von Lipinski, President of Nowa Scena announced that Miss Supranational 2016 will take place in two countries, Poland and Slovakia. First the contestants will arrive in Warsaw, Poland from where they will travel to the picturesque city of Poprad, Slovakia.

Results

Placements

§ – Voted into the Top 10 by online fans

Continental Queens of Beauty

Order of announcements

Top 25

Top 10

Top 5

Special awards

Judges
The judges' panel for Miss Supranational 2016 were:
 Rafał Maślak – Mister Polski 2014
 Stephanía Vasquez Stegman – Miss Supranational 2015
 Eryk Szulejewski – Managing director of Polsat
 Tomasz Barański – choreographer, Dancer
 Krzysztof Gojdź 
 Piotr Walczak 
 Robert Czepiel 
 Tomasz Szczepanik – Vocalist of Pectus
 Asha Bhat – Miss Supranational 2014
 Jozef Oklamčák – Prezes Oklamčák Production
 Gerhard Parzutka von Lipiński – President of Nowa Scena

Contestants
71 contestants competed for the title.

Notes

Debuts

Returns
Last competed in 2011:
 

Last competed in 2013:
 
 
 
 

Last competed in 2014:

Withdrawals

References

External links 
 

2016
2016 beauty pageants